Amit Paunikar (born 18 April 1988, Nagpur) is an Indian National cricketer. He is a Right-handed batsman and occasional right-arm medium bowler.

References

1988 births
Living people
Indian cricketers
Vidarbha cricketers
Railways cricketers
Rajasthan Royals cricketers
Central Zone cricketers
Wicket-keepers